A towel animal is a depiction of an animal created by folding small towels. It is conceptually similar to origami, but uses towels rather than paper. Some common towel animals are elephants, snakes, rabbits and swans.

Carnival, Norwegian Cruise Lines, Disney Cruise Line, Royal Caribbean, Disney Hotels and Holland America Line cruises will often place towel animals on a patron's bed as part of their nightly turndown service. Towel animals are also appearing in higher-end hotels and resorts such as Grupo Vidanta's Grand Luxxe Residence Clubs in Nuevo Vallarta and Riviera Maya.

History 
The exact originator of towel animals is unknown, but their popularity is often attributed to Carnival Cruise Lines. Carnival debuted its first towel animal in 1991. The ancestors of the towel animals are perhaps handkerchief animals or napkin folds.

Equipment and Training 
The equipment consists of a bath towel and optional accessories to enhance the features. Various items can be used to accessorize the towel animals such as glasses, buttons for eyes, wiggle eyes, or safety pins for a nose. It is also quite common to use rubber bands to assist in maintaining the towel shape. Some creations require the use of multiple towels and at times, hand towels or washcloths. The Grand Luxxe uses flowers or flower petals and the tips of palm branches to enhance some of their creations such as the image picturing a peacock and peahen. Carnival ship attendants receive over 10 hours of training in towel animal creation

Publications 
Carnival published a how to book on creating 40 different towel animal configurations. The most recent edition was published in 2011. The publication can be found on Carnival ships and Amazon.

Carnival offers their guests a book by pre-ordering before the cruise, or on board ship in the Formalities shop. Holland America makes a similar offer. There are several other books available on the subject.

Controversy and Decline

Norwegian Cruise Lines 
Beginning in April 2019, passengers on Norwegian Cruise Lines noticed a shortage in towel animals. In an effort to become more environmentally sustainable, the company is cutting back on its signature turndown service, the folded animal towel, and only providing them upon request by passengers. Reasons behind this decline include the water wastage it accumulates. With over 1000 cabins in most ships, and two towels on average being required to create the complex animals created on the cruises, and each of these towels needing to be washed. Further, the reduction in towel animals greatly decreases excess costs associated with laundry and time spent on housekeeping per room. While some cruise-goers support the push towards sustainability, this change has also elicited criticism from others, arguing that towel animals are part of the experience. Some cruise guests and environmentalists are even outraged by the new ban on towel animals because they think it is a puny attempt at sustainability when the cruises themselves are known to be one of the most environmentally harmful transportation methods. Other popular lines, such as Carnival and Royal Caribbean, have no plans to enact similar policies.

See also
Decorative folding
 Hotel toilet paper folding

References

External links

Example Towel Folding Guide

Handicrafts
Hospitality management
Linens